Tetragenococcus muriaticus is a species of moderately halophilic lactic acid, histamine-producing bacteria. X-1 (= JCM 10006) is the type strain of this species.

See also
Tetragenococcus halophilus

References

Further reading
Whitman, William B., et al., eds. Bergey's manual® of systematic bacteriology. Vol. 3. Springer, 2012.

External links

LPSN
Type strain of Tetragenococcus muriaticus at BacDive -  the Bacterial Diversity Metadatabase

Enterococcaceae
Bacteria described in 1997